The Armed Forces of South Russia (AFSR or SRAF) were the unified military forces of the White movement in southern Russia between 1919 and 1920.

On 8 January 1919, the Armed Forces of South Russia were formed, incorporating the Volunteer Army and the Don Army.  Subsequently, it included the Crimean-Azov Army, the Forces of Northern Caucasus and the Turkestan Army.

By October 1919, the army had 150,000 soldiers, which included 48,000 horsemen. The British had supplied 280,000 rifles, 4,898 machine guns, 917 cannons, 102 tanks, 194 airplanes 1,335 automobiles, 112 tractors, and what became known as Wrangel's fleet.

In May 1919, Denikin reorganized the Armed Forces of South Russia. Vladimir May-Mayevsky took command of the Volunteer Army, known formerly as the Caucasian Volunteer Army. Sidorin took command of the Don army, while Wrangel took command of the Caucasian Army, consisting mainly of the Kuban Cossacks. 

The Caucasus Army disbanded on 29 January 1920 and was replaced by the short-lived Kuban Army. Troops of the Kuban Army ended up surrendering by 18–20 April 1920 to the Red Army. The Volunteer Army continued to exist from 22 May 1919 until 26/27 March 1920, when the remaining troops were evacuated from Novorossiysk to Crimea. Most then merged there with Wrangel's forces.

In early April 1920, Anton Denikin, commander-in-chief of the AFSR, delegated all authority to Pyotr Wrangel, who took command of the so-called Russian Army, which included all remaining units of the AFSR after its defeat in Northern Caucasus.

Order of Battle of the AFSR, early 1919
 Volunteer Army (known as Caucasian Volunteer Army from 23 January – 22 May 1919), commanded by Gen. Anton Denikin (April 1918 – April 1920)
 1st Army Corps (Gen. Kutepov)
 2nd Army Corps (Gen. Mikhail Promtov)
 5th Cavalry Corps (Gen. Yuzefovich)
 3rd Kuban Cavalry Corps (Lt. Gen. Shkuro)
 Kyiv Army Group (Gen. Bredov)

 Caucasus Army (split from Caucasian Volunteer Army on 22 May 1919), commanded by Lt. Gen. Pyotr Wrangel (21 May – 8 December 1919) and Lt. Gen. Viktor Pokrovsky (9 December 1919 – 8 February 1920)
 1st Kuban Corps (Lt. Gen. Viktor Pokrovsky)
 2nd Kuban Corps (Gen. Ulaguy, later Gen. Nahumenko)
 4th Kuban Corps (Gen. Shatilov, later Gen. Toporkov)

 Don Army (joined AFSR on 23 February 1919), commanded by Gen. Vladimir Sidorin (February 1919 and April 1920)
 Northern Group (Starshina Semiletov)
 Southern Group (Gen. S. Denisov)
 Trans-Don (Zadonskaya) Group (Col. Bykadorov)

Turkestan Army (formed on 22 January 1919), commanded by Ippolit Savitsky (April – July 1919), Aleksander Borovsky (July – October 1919) and Boris Kazanovich (October 1919 – February 1920).
 Transcaspian Composite Inf. Division (Maj. Gen. Lazarev)
 Turkestan Rifle Division (Maj. Gen. Litvinov)
 Cavalry Division (Maj. Gen. Oraz-Khan Sedar)

Gallery

See also
 Don Republic
 Government of South Russia (Wrangel)
 Kuban People's Republic
 South Russia (1919–1920)
 South Russian Government (Denikin)

Reference

Additional Reading
 Н.Е.Какурин, И.И.Вацетис "Гражданская война. 1918-1921" (N.E.Kakurin, I.I.Vacietis "Civil War. 1918-1921") - Sankt-Peterburg, "Polygon" Publishing House, 2002. 

Military history of Russia
Military units and formations of White Russia (Russian Civil War)
Counter-revolutionaries